Premikudu is a 2016 Indian Telugu-language romantic drama film written and directed by Kala Sundeep. The film stars Maanas and Sanam Shetty in the lead roles. It was released on 17 June 2016.

Cast 
 Maanas Nagulapalli
 Sanam Shetty
 Ajith
 Shakalaka Shankar
 Paruchuri Venkateswara Rao
 Bhanu Chander

Production 
The film's title logo was launched in August 2015 at Prasad Labs in Hyderabad coinciding with Maanas's birthday. The event was presided by film producer Damodar Prasad, who was the chief guest. By August 2015, 60 percent of the film's shoot was complete, with the shoot primarily taking place in and around Bangalore.

The film's soundtrack was released on 13 March 2016 at a ceremony held at Rock Heights in Hyderabad. The previous day, a single track was premiered at an FM station. The film was dubbed into Malayalam by SS Cinema.

Release and reception 
The film released on 17 June 2016. A reviewer from film portal 123Telugu wrote "for a small budget film to be successful, it should have at least an unique story line or an interesting narration", adding "sadly, Premikudu does not have any of those going its way". A critic from NettTV noted that the film was "boring and outdated", but noted Maanas "acted decently and did justice to his character of selfless and ignorant youth", while Sanam "plays the character of the rich girl and has pulled it beautifully with her looks and attitude".

References 

2010s Telugu-language films
2016 films
2016 romance films